New Trails is a studio recording by the Western band Riders in the Sky, released in 1986.  It is available as a single CD.

Following their Live album in 1986, the trio returned to the studio, presenting several traditional Western songs, as well as some of their own creations.

Track listing
 "Cimarron" (Johnny Bond) – 2:23
 "Trail of Tears" (Lee Domann, Pebe Sebert, Ralph Whiteway) – 2:46
 "I'm Satisfied With You" (Fred Rose) – 2:03
 "Even Texas Isn't Big Enough Now" (Kerry Chater, Patti Dahlstrom) – 2:59
 "Slow Poke" (Pee Wee King, Chilton Price, Redd Stewart) – 2:24
 "Blue Bonnet Lady" (Paul Chrisman) – 2:45
 "Cowboy of the Highway" (Chrisman) – 2:59
 "Anytime" (Herbert Lawson) – 2:28
 "All Those Years" (Douglas B. Green) – 3:23
 "Soon as the Roundup's Through" (Chrisman) – 3:06

Personnel
Douglas B. Green (a.k.a. Ranger Doug) – guitar, vocals
Paul Chrisman (a.k.a. Woody Paul) – fiddle, vocals
Fred LaBour (a.k.a. Too Slim) – bass, vocals
Eddie Bayers – drums, percussion
Bruce Bouton – steel guitar
Gary Burnette – guitar
Sonny Garrish – steel guitar
Steve Gibson – guitar
Bud Green – harmonica, piano
Joe Osborne – bass
Larry Sasser – steel guitar
Buck White – piano
Paul Worley – guitar
Michael Black – background vocals
Scott Jarrett – background vocals
Robby Adcock – background vocals
Dennis Burnside – keyboards, string arrangements

External links
Riders in the Sky Official Website

1986 albums
Riders in the Sky (band) albums
Rounder Records albums